Phaeosaces is a genus of moths belonging to the family Depressariidae, endemic to New Zealand. It has been considered to be a synonym of Cryptolechia until reinstated as a valid genus by John S. Dugdale (1988).

Species 
Phaeosaces apocrypta Meyrick, 1885
Phaeosaces coarctatella (Walker, 1864)
Phaeosaces compsotypa Meyrick, 1885
Phaeosaces lindsayae (Philpott, 1928)

References

Moths of New Zealand
Gelechioidea